Niziol is a surname, likely of Polish origin. Notable people with the surname include:
 Bartek Niziol (born 1974), Polish violinist
 Wiesława Nizioł, Polish mathematician